is a museum of traditional Japanese art in Iwakuni, Yamaguchi Prefecture, Japan. The museum opened in 1963. The collection includes a National Treasure sword (of the Nanboku-chō period, with an inscription in gold inlay of Tenshō 13 (1585)) and Important Cultural Property armour (haramaki, also of the Nanboku-chō period).

See also

 List of National Treasures of Japan (crafts: swords)
 List of Cultural Properties of Japan - paintings (Yamaguchi)
 Yamaguchi Prefectural Museum of Art
 Iwakuni Castle, Kintai-kyō
 Kikkawa Historical Museum
 Iwakuni Chōkokan

References

External links
 Iwakuni Art Museum

Iwakuni, Yamaguchi
Museums in Yamaguchi Prefecture
Art museums and galleries in Japan
Museums established in 1963
1963 establishments in Japan